Brigitta B. Lotu-Iiga (born 9 February 1968) is a former New Zealand rugby union player. She made her debut for the New Zealand women's national side, the Black Ferns, on 2 May against Germany at the 1998 Women's Rugby World Cup. She made her final appearance at a Bledisloe Cup curtain raiser match against Australia in Sydney; the Black Ferns won 27–3.

Her younger brother is former New Zealand MP, Sam Lotu-Iiga.

References 

1968 births
Living people
New Zealand women's international rugby union players
New Zealand female rugby union players
Sportspeople from Apia
Samoan emigrants to New Zealand
People educated at Epsom Girls' Grammar School